This is a list of Wave topics.

0–9
21 cm line

A
Abbe prism
Absorption spectroscopy
Absorption spectrum
Absorption wavemeter
Acoustic wave
Acoustic wave equation
Acoustics
Acousto-optic effect
Acousto-optic modulator
Acousto-optics
Airy disc
Airy wave theory
Alfvén wave
Alpha waves
Amphidromic point
Amplitude
Amplitude modulation
Animal echolocation
Antarctic Circumpolar Wave
Antiphase
Aquamarine Power
Arrayed waveguide grating
Artificial wave
Atmospheric diffraction
Atmospheric wave
Atmospheric waveguide
Atom laser
Atomic clock
Atomic mirror
Audience wave
Autowave
Averaged Lagrangian

B
Babinet's principle
Backward wave oscillator
Bandwidth-limited pulse
beat
Berry phase
Bessel beam
Beta wave
Black hole
Blazar
Bloch's theorem
Blueshift
Boussinesq approximation (water waves)
Bow wave
Bragg diffraction
Bragg's law
Breaking wave
Bremsstrahlung, Electromagnetic radiation
Brillouin scattering
Bullet bow shockwave
Burgers' equation
Business cycle

C
Capillary wave
Carrier wave
Cherenkov radiation
Chirp
Ernst Chladni
Circular polarization
Clapotis
Closed waveguide
Cnoidal wave
Coherence (physics)
Coherence length
Coherence time
Cold wave
Collimated light
Collimator
Compton effect
Comparison of analog and digital recording
Computation of radiowave attenuation in the atmosphere
Continuous phase modulation
Continuous wave
Convective heat transfer
Coriolis frequency
Coronal mass ejection
Cosmic microwave background radiation
Coulomb wave function
Cutoff frequency
Cutoff wavelength
Cymatics

D
Damped wave
Decollimation
Delta wave
Dielectric waveguide
Diffraction
Direction finding
Dispersion (optics)
Dispersion (water waves)
Dispersion relation
Dominant wavelength
Doppler effect
Doppler radar
Douglas Sea Scale
Draupner wave
Droplet-shaped wave
Duhamel's principle

E
E-skip
Earthquake
Echo (phenomenon)
Echo sounding
Echolocation (animal)
Echolocation (human)
Eddy (fluid dynamics)
Edge wave
Eikonal equation
Ekman layer
Ekman spiral
Ekman transport
El Niño–Southern Oscillation
Electroencephalography
Electromagnetic electron wave
Electromagnetic radiation
Electromagnetic wave
Electromagnetic wave cut-off
Electron
Elliott wave
Elliptical polarization
Emission spectrum
Envelope (waves)
Equatorial Rossby wave
Equatorial waves
Essential bandwidth
Evanescent wave
Extratropical cyclone
Extremely low frequency

F
F wave
Fabry–Pérot interferometer
Faraday wave
Fetch (geography)
Fourier series
Fraunhofer diffraction
Fraunhofer distance
Freak wave
Frequency
Frequency modulation
Fresnel diffraction
Fresnel equations
Fresnel integral
Fresnel lens
Fresnel number
Fresnel rhomb
Fresnel zone
Fresnel–Arago laws 
Fundamental frequency

G
Gamma ray
Gamma ray burst
Gamma wave
Gaussian beam
Geometric optics, Geometrical optics
Geostrophic current
Gravitational radiation
Gravity wave
Groundwave
Group delay
Group velocity

H
Harmonic
Heat wave
Holography
Human echolocation
Hundred-year wave
Hurricane
Huygens' principle
Hydraulic jump
Hydrography
Hydropower
Hyperbolic partial differential equation

I
In phase
Inertial wave
Infragravity wave
Infrared gas analyzer
Inhomogeneous electromagnetic wave equation
Interference (wave propagation)
Interferometry
Internal wave
Inverse scattering transform
Ion acoustic wave
Irradiance

K
Kelvin wave
Kinematic wave
Knife-edge effect
Kondratiev wave

L
Lamb waves
Landau damping
Lee wave
Linear elasticity
Linear polarization
List of waves named after people
Long wavelength limit
Longitudinal mode
Longitudinal wave
Longwave
Love wave

M
Mach wave
Mach–Zehnder interferometer
Maelstrom (disambiguation)
Magnetometer
Magnetosonic wave
Matter wave
Maxwell's equations
Mayer waves
Mechanical wave
Medical ultrasonography
Mediumwave
Megatsunami
Microbarom
Microwave
Microwave auditory effect
Microwave oven
Microwave plasma
Microwaving
Mie scattering
Millimeter cloud radar
Modulation
Monochromatic electromagnetic plane wave
Monochromator
Moonlight
Morning Glory cloud
Mu wave
Multipath propagation

N
Neural oscillation
Neutron
Nondispersive infrared sensor
Nonlinear Schrödinger equation
Nonlinear wave
Nonlinear X-wave
Normal mode

O
Ocean surface wave
One-Way Wave Equation
Optical fiber
Optical waveguide
Oscillon
Out of phase
Outgoing longwave radiation
Overtone
Oyster wave energy converter

P
P-wave
Parabolic reflector
Periodic function
Periodic travelling wave
Phase (waves)
Phase difference
Phase modulation
Phase velocity
Phonon
Photon
Pitch shifter (audio processor)
Planck constant
Planck's law
Plane wave
Polarization (waves)
Ponto-geniculo-occipital waves, PGO waves
Power standing wave ratio
pp-wave spacetime
Pressure wave
Prism
Proton
Pulsar
Pulsar wind nebula
Pulse wave velocity
Pulse-density modulation

Q
QT interval
quadrature
Quadrature amplitude modulation
Quantum optics
Quantum tunneling
Quantum Zeno effect

R
Radar
Radar astronomy
Radar cross section
Radar gun
Radio propagation
Radio waves
Radiosity (heat transfer)
Rayleigh scattering
Rayleigh wave
Rayleigh–Jeans law
Redshift
Reflection coefficient
Reflection seismology
Refraction
Relativistic Doppler effect
Resonance
Resonator
Ring laser gyroscope
Ring modulation
Ring wave guide
Rip current
ripple
Ripple tank
Rogue wave (oceanography)
Rossby wave
Rossby-gravity waves
Rydberg constant
Rydberg formula

S
S-wave
Sampling (signal processing)
Sawtooth wave
Schrödinger equation
Sea state
Seiche
Seismic wave
Seismograph
Seismology
Sellmeier equation
Shallow water equations
Shive wave machine
Shock wave
Shortwave radio
Signal velocity
Significant wave height
Sine wave
Single-sideband modulation
Sinusoidal plane-wave solutions of the electromagnetic wave equation
Skywave
Slow-wave potential
Slow-wave sleep
Sneaker wave
Solitary wave
Soliton
Sonar
Sonic anemometers
Sound wave
Spark-gap transmitter
Spectroscopy
Speed of gravity
Speed of light
Speed of sound
Spike-and-wave
Spin wave
Square wave
Standing wave
Standing wave ratio
Stefan–Boltzmann law
Stokes drift
Stokes wave
Subharmonic
Super low frequency
Superharmonic
Superposition principle
Supersonic Wave Filter
Surface acoustic wave
Surface wave
Surface wave inversion
Surface-wave magnitude
Surface-wave-sustained discharge
Surfing
Sverdrup wave
Swell (ocean)
Synthetic-aperture radar

T
T wave
Terrestrial gamma-ray flash
Terrestrial stationary waves
Theta wave
Tidal bore
Tidal power
Tidal resonance
Tide
Tired light theory
Transverse mode
Transverse wave
Traveling plane wave
Traveling wave antenna
Traveling wave reactor
Traveling-wave tube
Triangle wave
Trigonometric function
Trojan wave packet
Tropical wave
Tsunami
Turbidity current

U
Ultra low frequency
Ultrasound
Ultraviolet catastrophe
Undertow (wave action)
Underwater wave
Undular bore

V
Velocity factor
Vestigial-sideband modulation
Vibrating string
Voltage standing wave ratio
Vortex
Vorticity

W
Wake
Wave (audience)
Wave base
Wave disk engine
Wave drag
Wave equation
Wave farm
Wave field synthesis
Wave function
Wave function collapse
Wave height
Wave impedance
Wave loading
Wave motor
Wave packet
Wave period
Wave plate
Wave pool
Wave pounding
Wave power
Wave propagation
Wave shoaling
Wave surface
Wave tank
Wave turbulence
Wave vector
Wave velocity
Wave–current interaction
Wave-cut platform
Wave-making resistance
Waveform
Waveform monitor
Wave-formed ripple
Wavefront
Wavefunction
Wavefunction collapse
Waveguide
Waveguide (acoustics)
Waveguide (electromagnetism)
Waveguide (optics)
Waveguide flange
Wavelength
Wavelength selective switching
Wavelength-division multiplexing
Wavelet
Wavelet transform
Wavenumber
Zonal wavenumber
Wavenumber-frequency diagram
Wave–particle duality
Waverider
Waves and shallow water
Waves in plasmas
Whitham's method
Wien approximation
Wien's displacement law
Wien's law
Wind wave
Windsurfing

X
X-band radar
X-ray
X-wave

Z
Zero-dispersion slope
Zero-dispersion wavelength
Zigzag
Zodiacal light
Zone plate

Wave topics
Wave topics